Anthony "Tony" Clark is a Welsh former professional darts player who competed in events of the British Darts Organisation (BDO) in the 1970s and 1980s.

Career
Clark played in the 1979 BDO World Darts Championship, beating Bill Lennard in the first round before losing to defending champion Leighton Rees. He then reached the quarter finals of the 1979 Winmau World Masters, losing to Canada's Allan Hogg who eventually reached the final only to lose to Eric Bristow. In the 1980 BDO World Darts Championship, he defeated Alan Glazier in the first round before losing to Bristow. Clark would reach the second round once more in the 1981 BDO World Darts Championship, defeating Lennard again in the first round before losing to Bobby George.

Clark disappeared from the scene until 2006 when he played in the Welsh Classic, reaching the last 32 stage. Clark then made his first televised appearance in 27 years by reaching the quarter finals of the 2008 Welsh Open which was screened live on Setanta Sports. He had beaten Stuart Kellet, Paul Hogan and Willy van de Wiel in the earlier rounds before losing to Mark Webster. Clark then reached the final of the 2008 Border Classic, beating Robbie Green in the semi finals before losing 6–0 to Wayne Jones. Clark attempt to qualify for the 2008 Las Vegas Desert Classic, but lost in the first round of both qualifiers. He then tried to qualify for the 2009 BDO World Darts Championship but lost in the first round and also suffered a first round exit in the 2008 World Masters.

World Championship results

BDO
 1979: 2nd round: (lost to Leighton Rees 1–2)
 1980: 2nd round: (lost to Eric Bristow 0–2)
 1981: 2nd round: (lost to Bobby George 0–2)

External links
Profile and stats from Darts Database

Living people
Welsh darts players
British Darts Organisation players
1955 births